Gerald "Gerry" O'Reilly is an Irish Olympic middle-distance runner. He represented his country in the men's 1500 meters at the 1988 Summer Olympics. His time was a 3:43.23 in the first heat.

Career 
Gerald has worked at Vanguard since March 1992 and is now a Principal Portfolio Manager, overseeing over $800B in assets, including the Vanguard Total Stock Market Index Fund (VTSAX) which is the third largest US mutual fund by assets under management.

See also
1987 World Championships in Athletics – Men's 1500 metres
1989 IAAF World Indoor Championships – Men's 3000 metres

References 

1964 births
Living people
Irish male middle-distance runners
Olympic athletes of Ireland
Athletes (track and field) at the 1988 Summer Olympics